The Leaman's Place Covered Bridge is a covered bridge that spans Pequea Creek in Lancaster County, Pennsylvania, United States. A county-owned and maintained bridge, its official designation is the Pequea #4 Bridge.  The bridge is also known as Eshelman's Mill Covered Bridge and Paradise Bridge.

The bridge has a single span, wooden, double Burr arch trusses design with the addition of steel hanger rods. The deck is made from oak planks.  It is painted red, the traditional color of Lancaster County covered bridges, on both the inside and outside. Both approaches to the bridge are painted in the traditional white color.

The bridge's WGCB Number is 38-36-20. Added in 1980, it is listed on the National Register of Historic Places as structure number 80003519. It is located on the boundary between Paradise and Leacock townships at  (40.01200, -76.10783).

History
The land that the Leaman's Place Covered Bridge is situated on was settled by the family of Mary
Ferree in 1712, a land grant by William Penn in an area inhabited by the Pequaws Indians.  
It was not until 1845 that James C. Carpenter built the covered bridge across the Pequea Creek at a cost of $933. In 1893,Note:  Elias McMellan rebuilt the covered bridge at a cost of $2,431. The bridge was rehabilitated in 2004.

Dimensions 
Source:
Length: 102 feet (31.1 m) span and  total length
Width:  Note:
Overhead clearance: 
Underclearance:

Gallery

See also
Burr arch truss
List of Lancaster County covered bridges

References 

Covered bridges in Lancaster County, Pennsylvania
Bridges completed in 1894
Covered bridges on the National Register of Historic Places in Pennsylvania
National Register of Historic Places in Lancaster County, Pennsylvania
Road bridges on the National Register of Historic Places in Pennsylvania
Wooden bridges in Pennsylvania
Burr Truss bridges in the United States